This is a list of slums in Eswatini (Swaziland).

Moneni
Msunduza
Nkawlini
There were about 200 slum or informal settlers as of 2004 but through Swaziland Urban Development Project (SUDP) new houses were built for the settlers in 2005 
making Eswatini one of the few countries in Africa with no slums. Though it is estimated that over 5% of the rural population in Eswatini lives traditional 
houses made of stick and mud.

See also

 List of slums

References

Slums
Eswatini
Eswatini